Cladonia parasitica, commonly known as the fence-rail cladonia, fence-rail cup lichen or parasite club lichen, is a species of fruticose, cup lichen in the family Cladoniaceae. It was first described by Hoffmann in  1784 under the name Lichen parasiticus, until he reclassified it under the genus Cladonia in 1795.

Description 
Cladonia parasitica mainly grows on old oak and pine wood. The thallus is brown or grey. The squamules are minutely divided and look like coral or  small scales. When apothecia are present they take the form of small brown morel-like protrusions  atop the branches. The species is found in North America and Eurasia in the boreal, boreal-nemoral, and nemoral regions. It is  used as a signal species, indicating high-value old-growth forest. Its secondary metabolites include barbatic acid, decarboxythamnolic acid and thamnolic acid.

See also
List of Cladonia species

References

 , Deutschl. Fl., Zweiter Theil (Erlangen): 127 (1796)
  1796 ['1795']. Deutschlands Flora oder Botanisches Taschenbuch. Zweiter Theil für das Jahr 1795. Cryptogamie.: 1–200. Mattick Rec.# 23603 – Recent Literature on Lichens

External links
  Cladonia parasitica
 Cladonia parasitica
  - Cladonia parasitica
  Cladonia parasitica
  (photo by M. Sutcliffe) Cladonia parasitica
  (photo by M. Sutcliffe) Cladonia parasitica
  (photo by M. Sutcliffe) Cladonia parasitica
The Lichenologist 41(1): 61–67.(RLL List # 214 / Rec.# 31169 - Recent Literature on Lichens) (doi:10.1017/S002428290900807X)
 USDA Plant Database
 North American Lichen Checklist
 List of British Lichens & Lichenicolous Fungi
 Brodo, Sharnoff, & Sharnoff. 2001. Lichens of North America
 
 

parasitica
Lichen species
Lichens described in 1784